Salvador Correia de Sá e Benevides (1594 in Rio de Janeiro or 1602 in Cádiz – January 1, 1688 in Lisbon) was a Portuguese admiral and crown administrator. In 1625 he fought the Dutch invasion of Salvador in Brazil and regained Angola and São Tomé Island from the Dutch in 1647. He was the governor of Rio de Janeiro, parts of Southern Brazil and Angola.

Biography
Salvador Correia de Sá was born in the family of the Sás, being the great-grandson of Mem de Sá, third Governor-General of Brazil, and of Estácio de Sá, founder of the city of Rio de Janeiro. In 1625 he fought the Dutch invasion of Salvador, joining a combined Spanish and Portuguese fleet of fifty-two ships that regained the control of the former capital of Brazil. He became governor of the Rio de Janeiro captaincy in 1637.

He acclaimed John IV of Portugal in 1641 at the beginning of the Portuguese Restoration War, to regain Portuguese independence from the Iberian Union. This cost him many of the assets he held in Peru and Spain. Back in Portugal, in 1643 was named general of the fleets of Brazil and member of the Portuguese Overseas Council, established in 1643. In order to oust the Dutch from their occupation in Africa, in 1647 he commanded a fleet that regained Angola and São Tomé for Portugal, then he was appointed governor of Angola.  From 1658 until 1662, was appointed governor and captain-general of the captaincy in southern Brazil. He harshly suppressed a revolt in 1661, which cost him the governorship.  He was out of favor for several years, but then remained until death as a member of the Overseas Council. In 1678, he volunteered to command the expedition to Angola to moderate rebellion, near Mombasa, but his advanced age did not permit him to do so.

Notes

References

Further reading
 Boxer, Charles R.: Salvador de Sá and the struggle for Brazil and Angola, 1602-1686, Greenwood Press, 1975, 
Cardozo, Manoel. "Notes for a Biography of Salvador Correia de Sá e Benavides, 1594-1688." The Americas 7, no. 2 (1950), 135-170.
 Dutra, Francis A. "Salvador correia de Sá e Benavides" in Encyclopedia of Latin American History and Culture, vol. 5, p. 2. New York: Charles Scribner's Sons 1996.
Norton, Luis. A dinastia dos Sás no Brasil, 1558-1662. 2nd. ed. 1965.
 Ribeiro de Lessa, Clado. Salvador Correia de Sá e Benavides: vida e feitos principalmente no Brasil. 1940/

Portuguese colonial governors and administrators
Portuguese soldiers
1602 births
1688 deaths
Governors of Portuguese Angola
17th century in Angola
People of the Dutch–Portuguese War
Portuguese colonisation in Africa
Portuguese colonization of the Americas
17th-century Portuguese people